Ojuelegba is a suburb in Surulere local government area of Lagos State. Known for its crowded setting as depicted in Fela's 1975 Confusion album, Ojuelegba is regarded as one of the busiest places in Lagos.

Structural composition
Ojuelegba is one of the key transport modes of Lagos, connecting the city's Mainland with the Island. It also serves as a connecting point for people who commute the three surrounding districts of Yaba, Mushin and Surulere.

Life in Ojuelegba has been depicted in several musical works, including Fela's Confusion album, Wizkid's "Ojuelegba" single and Oritse Femi's "Double Wahala" single.

Night life
In the 80s and 90s, Ojuelebga was known for its boisterous night life, connecting revelers to Fela Kuti's Moshalashi Shrine on Agege Motor Road and to the red light district starting in Ayilara street through to parts of Clegg Street.

Mini Gallery

See also
 Confusion
 Ojuelegba (Wizkid song)

References

Populated places in Lagos State